Cymbidium mastersii, the Master's cymbidium, is a species of orchid.

mastersii